Pink Lipstick is a 2010 South Korean television drama starring Park Eun-hye, Lee Joo-hyun, Park Gwang-hyun and Seo Yoo-jung. It aired on MBC from January 11 to August 6, 2010 on Mondays to Fridays at 7:50 a.m. for 149 episodes.

Synopsis
Yoo Ga-eun is a sweet-natured girl who married her college sweetheart, Park Jung-woo. However, she later discovers that her husband had an affair with her best friend, Kim Mi-ran, and that their adopted daughter Na-ri is actually Jung-woo and Mi-ran's lovechild. After she and Jung-woo divorce, Ga-eun meets Ha Jae-bum, and they fall deeply in love. But when she learns that Jung-woo plotted her father's downfall, causing her brother Sung-eun to die in prison, Ga-eun sets aside love to wreak her revenge against Jung-woo and Mi-ran. She starts by getting engaged to Maeng Ho-geol, a wealthy clothing retailer who is Jae-bum's uncle.

Cast
Main cast
 Park Eun-hye as Yoo Ga-eun 
 Lee Joo-hyun as Park Jung-woo
 Ryu Ui-hyun as young  Park Jung-woo
 Park Gwang-hyun as Ha Jae-bum 
 Seo Yoo-jung as Kim Mi-ran / Julia Kim
 Bang Joon-seo as young Mi-ran

Yoo family
 Nam Il-woo as Yoo Dong-gook, father
 Kim Young-ran as Jung Hae-shil, mother
 Moon Ji-yoon as Yoo Sung-eun, brother 
 Kim Min-hwa as Yoo Young-eun, sister

Park family
 Oh Mi-yeon as Han Bun-nyeo, mother
 MayBee as Park Jung-hee, sister
 Kim Su-jung as Park Na-ri, Jung-woo and Mi-ran's daughter

Extended cast 
 Dokgo Young-jae as Maeng Ho-geol, owner of Taeyang Apparel
 Sung Woong as Maeng Seo-jin, Ho-geol's son and Jae-bum's friend
 Yu Ji-in as Jung Mal-ja / Betty Jung, Mi-ran's mother
 Lee Sang-hoon as Yeo Ki-byul
 Jung Yoo-chan as Kim Young-gyu
 Baek Bo-ram as Yoon Na-na
 Lee Jung-yong as Cho Yong-kap / Mister Cho
 Song Ji-eun as Kim Min-joo, Mi-ran's friend
 Won Jong-rye as Oh Soo-ji 
 Kan Jong-wook as Club Singer (cameo)
 Sung Hyuk

Awards
 2010 MBC Drama Awards: Excellence Award, Actress - Park Eun-hye

International broadcast
 : GEM TV (2011)
 : TV5 (2012)
: True Asian Series (2012)
 : VTV3 (24/05/2013)
 : Indosiar (2014)

References

External links
Pink Lipstick official MBC website 
Pink Lipstick at MBC Global Media

MBC TV television dramas
2010 South Korean television series debuts
2010 South Korean television series endings
Korean-language television shows
South Korean romance television series
South Korean melodrama television series